Ulaanbaatar Broadcasting System, or UBS, is a television broadcaster in Mongolia. It operates three channels, UBS which is the main channel, UBS Global and UBS Music Channel.

It is currently owned by Balkhjav Lkhagvadorj and Bayar J.

History
UBS Television, formerly known as Ulzii Television, was founded by Ulaanbaatar City Administration and first aired on 15 September 1992.

In 2002, City Council became the new owner.

In 2007, it was fully privatized.

TV programming
Sumo tournaments
City News
Universe Best Songs

See also
Media of Mongolia
Communications in Mongolia

References

External links
Official Site 

Television companies of Mongolia
Television channels and stations established in 1992